The 1929–1930 Arsenal F.C. season was 11th consecutive season in the top division of English football. The Gunners won their first ever piece of silverware this season, beating manager Herbert Chapman's old side Huddersfield Town 2–0 in the FA Cup final, the first of many FA Cups the Gunners would go on to win.

Results
Arsenal's score comes first

Legend

Football League First Division

Final League table

FA Cup

See also

 1929–30 in English football
 List of Arsenal F.C. seasons

References

English football clubs 1929–30 season
1929-30